The name Washington Island refers to:

Washington Island (Wisconsin), the largest of the islands that make up the Town of Washington in Door County, Wisconsin
Washington Island (Michigan) in Keweenaw County, Michigan
Washington Island (Minnesota) in Lake County, Minnesota
Washington Island (New York) in Jefferson County, New York
Teraina, also known as Washington Island, Kiribati
Washington Islands Wilderness in Washington state
An 18th-century name for Ua Huka, later extended as the "Washington Islands" to include all of the northern Marquesas Islands